Robert G. McAndrews was a Scottish professional golfer. McAndrews placed tied for seventh in the 1898 U.S. Open, held at Myopia Hunt Club in South Hamilton, Massachusetts.

References

Scottish male golfers
Scottish emigrants to the United States